Suit of Lights is a rock band. They have been described as an "indie rock manifestation" led by Joe Darone, whose noteworthy contributors include Trevor Dunn from Mr. Bungle, Steve Pedulla from Thursday, and Jamie Egan from Catch 22 and Streetlight Manifesto.

Current contributing members
Joe Darone (Vocals, bass, keyboards and programming)
Arun Venkatesh (Lead and rhythm guitar, programming)
James Kluz (Drums and percussion)

Past contributing members
Trevor Dunn (electric and upright bass)
Steve Pedulla (lead guitar)
James Egan (trumpet, trombone, saxophone and flute)
Dan McGowan (guitar)
Chris Connors (guitar)
John Underwood (guitar)
Evan Silverman (electric and upright bass)
Billy Carrión Jr (bass)
Roy Van Tassel (drums)
Dino Covelli (keyboards)
Scott Chasolen (piano, organ, rhodes, wurlitzer, clavinet and moog)

Official discography
"Waking Up is Good / Goodbye Silk City" (7”, 2004)
Suit of Lights (CD, 2005)
Bacteria (CD, 2009)
Shine On Forever (CD, 2012)
Break Open the Head (LP/CD, 2016)
Hide and Seek (LP/CD, 2020)
The Empty Vault (Digital Single, 2022)

Compilation appearances
Paste 14
Loud Merch Volume One
Magnet New Music Sampler Volume 37
Wonkavision Everlasting Sampler Vol. 5
Pop Culture Press CD No. 22
Relix March 2013 CD Sampler
Prog P45: See Emily Play
Prog P112: A Gentleman's Excuse Me

External links
 Official website
 Suit of Lights at Spotify
 Suit of Lights at Apple Music
 Suit of Lights at YouTube

Indie rock musical groups from New Jersey
Musical groups established in 2004